International Textile Group (ITG) is a diversified American fabric maker based in Beverly Hills, California. The company was founded in Greensboro, North Carolina by Wilbur Ross and was sold to Platinum Equity in 2016, leading to its move from Greensboro to Beverly Hills.

Current operations
ITG's operating companies include:
 Cone Denim
 Burlington WorldWide Apparel
 Burlington House Interior Fabrics
 Carlisle Finishing
 Automotive Safety Textiles

Locations
ITG continues to manufacture fabrics in North America, but it has also developed fabric mills in China, Vietnam and Central America. Its best-known fabrics are denim and specialty nylon fabrics used in automotive airbag systems.

Denim fabrics are made in the United States, in Greensboro, NC, in Mexico and are also now being made in China and Nicaragua in new company plants. In the summer of 2009, ITG reported that it had closed the Nicaragua mill- which it had just opened- because its main customer moved its cut and sew operation out of Nicaragua. This makes the venture to build the plant almost a total loss to ITG. Many ready-to-wear brands purchase fabrics from Cone Denim, including Levi's, Wrangler and American Eagle Outfitters. The company is also known for its worsted wool fabrics, which are made in North Carolina and in Mexico. The company has developed a source for wool fabrics in India by working with OCM India Limited, a mill in Amritsar, India, which is also owned by funds controlled by W.L. Ross & Co. Customers of the wool fabrics include many well-known makers of wool garments (such as Jos A. Bank and others). The company also produces some technical fabrics, such as fabrics made of polyester and nylon. These fabrics have a variety of uses, such as in uniforms, in performance apparel items and for safety services.

Brands
The ITG Automotive Group manufactures fabrics and cushion for airbags, which are sold to automotive safety groups, such as Autoliv, TRW and Delphi. Many automobiles throughout the world contain ITG's safety fabrics. The fabrics and cushion are manufactured in various locations (U.S., Germany, Poland, China, Mexico).

The company owns the brand BURLINGTON, which is licensed to a company in Germany for a European menswear brand.

History
The company was founded by Wilbur Ross. WL Ross & Co acquired the assets of the former Burlington Industries out of bankruptcy in late 2003, and the assets of the former Cone Mills Corporation in 2004.

In 2006, ITG merged with Safety Components International, Inc., a Greenville, South Carolina company that manufactures nylon fabrics that are used in automotive airbags, that was also controlled by Wilbur Ross.

In January 2007, ITG announced that it was selling it mattress fabric product line to Culp, Inc., another U.S. textile company that is based in High Point, NC. Also during 2007, the Company has opened a mill in China that will develop apparel and interior fabrics and the Company is developing a Vietnam venture that will supply apparel fabrics and garments.

On April 1, 2007, BST Safety Textiles came into the ITG family of business. By adding BST Safety Textiles ITG's business in automotive components has now grown significantly. However, in the summer of 2009, ITG's air bag unit filed bankruptcy and was taken over by secured creditors.

In December 2006, Wilbur Ross completed the purchase of BST Safety Textiles GmbH (BST), previously known as Berger Safety Textiles, of Maulburg, Germany. BST is a producer of flat fabric used in manufacturing automobile airbags, one piece woven (known as OPW) airbags, and narrow fabric used in automobile seatbelts and all types of industrial strapping applications. BST currently operates locations in southern Germany, Poland, and the US in Virginia. BST employs over 1200 persons worldwide.

Recently, the company sold certain trademark rights to the BURLINGTON brand in Europe to FALKE, a European high-fashion brand.

The company was sold to private equity firm Platinum Equity in 2016, and later moved its headquarters to its parent company's home city of Beverly Hills.

The White Oak denim mill ceased operations on December 31, 2017.

References

External links
 Hoover's Overview, retrieved August 7, 2006.
 International Textile Group at Yahoo! Finance
Official Website

Companies established in 2003
Textile companies of the United States
Manufacturing companies based in North Carolina
Companies based in Beverly Hills, California
2016 mergers and acquisitions